Bar Karma is the first online community-developed network television series. Online users pitch their own ideas for scenes and twists online, using a tool designed by Will Wright called the Storymaker. Some are eventually chosen by the production staff, and are utilized to help create a new episode every week. The main plot revolves around a bar known as "Bar Karma", a bar that resides someplace in between parallel timelines. Up until now, the typical structure of the shows consists of a patron accidentally walking into or being transported to the bar, where they are shown the consequences of their current life actions, and the potential outcomes for their behavior and choices. This, ultimately, leads to a karmic dilemma, and forces the patron to make a life-altering choice.

In the first episode, Doug Jones suddenly walks into the bar after a one-night stand. He is confused, and thinks that he accidentally fell asleep and is dreaming. When he finally realizes that this is some strange form of reality, James (Sanderson) and Dayna (Howarth) explain to him why he is in the bar, and is given the chance to alter his fate, and the course of "Bar Karma."

Plot

There's a place at the edge of the universe, a venue that's behind time and before space, a watering hole where the tab you run up may never be paid - in this lifetime, at least.

That place is Bar Karma.

Notoriously lucky billionaire Doug Jones wins Bar Karma on a bet. He soon learns that ownership includes more than pouring the perfect cocktail - a lot more. Every happy hour one lost soul wanders through the bar's doors, finding themselves at a karmic crossroads in his or her life. The Bar Karma staff guides their patrons using eerie glimpses into the past, present and many possible futures.

What would happen if you could change your fate? That's the question Bar Karma sets out to answer. The show may begin with "A guy walks into a bar..." but Bar Karma always ends with someone's life being changed...forever.

Characters
Doug Jones portrayed by Matthew Humphreys
Cocky Internet mogul Doug Jones never intended to own a bar. But when you're made of luck, you tend to win a few pots at the poker table—and one of them included the deed to Bar Karma. Now he's responsible for helping his customers make life-changing decisions. Which is funny, considering that Doug hasn't a clue whether he's made the right decisions himself.

James Anon portrayed by William Sanderson
Grizzled bartender James has been pouring drinks at Bar Karma for as long as he can remember. For a man who's over 20,000 years old, that's a long time. James has died more than 500 deaths, returning each time with hazy memories of his past lives—and the wrongs he still needs to right.

Dayna Rollins portrayed by Cassie Howarth
Dayna was once a patron at the bar, facing her own karmic crossroads. Rather than return to her unhappy life on Earth, Dayna made a bold move; she asked James the bartender for a job. Now as the bar's lone waitress and a member of the Bar Karma team, she helps guide customers through their pasts and futures, while keeping herself rooted firmly in the present.

Episodes

Producers

 Will Wright - Co-Creator
 Albie Hecht - Executive Producer
 David Cohn - Current's Executive in Charge
 Laura Knight - Supervising Producer
 Peter Swearengen - Storymaker Producer

External links
 

2011 American television series debuts
2011 American television series endings
2010s American science fiction television series
English-language television shows